Raga is a Tehsil in the Indian state of Arunachal Pradesh. Kamle district is the name of the district that contains Tehsil Raga. The MLA of Raga constituency is Tarin Dapke.

Raga is located 44 km towards North from District headquarters Ziro. It is 100 km from State capital Itanagar towards South. It is one of the 60 constituencies of Legislative Assembly of Arunachal Pradesh. Name of current MLA (October-2016) of this constituency is Tamar Murtem.

In October 2017 the state government approved the creation of Kamle district, which will have its headquarters in Raga.

Demographics
The population of the city of Raga at the 2011 census was 1,281, and the encompassing administrative circle, "Raga Circle", had a population of over 5,000.

See also
List of constituencies of Arunachal Pradesh Legislative Assembly
Arunachal Pradesh Legislative Assembly

References

Kamle district